The 2020 Indian Super League Final was the final match of the 2019–20 Indian Super League season, the sixth season of the Indian Super League. It was played between Chennayin FC and ATK, on 14 March 2020 at the Fatorda Stadium, Goa. It was played to determine the winner of the 2019–20 season of the Indian Super League.

Owing to COVID-19 pandemic in India the final was played behind closed doors.

Two times Champions ATK won the final after beating Chennayin by 3–1.

Background
Prior to this cup final both the finalists ATK and Chennayin won the trophy twice (the maximum ever won by any Indian Super League side). ATK won in 2014 and 2016 both against Kerala Blasters whereas Chennayin won in 2015 against Goa (in the same stadium where the final match of this season was played) and in 2018 against Bengaluru FC. Also both the teams reached the final previously for twice, hence they were going to appear for their 3rd final which also meant that this final was going to decide the 3rd for either of these teams.

Match

 

</onlyinclude>

Aftermath
This victory meant ATK became the Indian Super League Champions for the 3rd time which made them the most successful team in the tournament's history. At the same time this defeat meant Chennayin lost the final for the 1st time.

Notes

References

External links
 Indian Super League Official Website.

Indian Super League finals
2019–20 Indian Super League season
2019–20 in Indian football
Indian Super League Final
ATK (football club) matches
Chennaiyin FC matches
Association football events curtailed due to the COVID-19 pandemic
Sport in Goa